The 2003–04 2. Bundesliga was the 30th season of the 2. Bundesliga, the second tier of the German football league system. 1. FC Nürnberg, Arminia Bielefeld and Mainz 05 were promoted to the Bundesliga while VfB Lübeck, Jahn Regensburg, Union Berlin and VfL Osnabrück were relegated to the Regionalliga.

League table
For the 2003–04 season SSV Jahn Regensburg, SpVgg Unterhaching, Erzgebirge Aue and VfL Osnabrück were newly promoted to the 2. Bundesliga from the Regionalliga while Arminia Bielefeld, 1. FC Nürnberg and FC Energie Cottbus had been relegated to the league from the Bundesliga.

Results

Top scorers
The league's top scorers:

References

External links
 Official Bundesliga site  
 2. Bundesliga @ DFB 
 kicker.de 

2. Bundesliga seasons
2
Germany